Paul Sherrell (born March 28, 1959) is an American politician. A  Republican, he represents District 43 in the Tennessee House of Representatives.

Political career 

In 2016, Sherrell ran for election to represent District 43 in the Tennessee House of Representatives. He won a three-way Republican primary with 45.16% of the vote, and went on to win the general election against Democratic incumbent Kevin Dunlap in the general election. He was re-elected in 2018 and ran again in 2020.

In November 2018, Tennessee House Republicans elected Sherrell to serve as Majority Floor Leader. As of June 2020, Sherrell sits on the following committees:
 Judiciary Committee
 Constitutional Protections & Sentencing Subcommittee
 Health Committee
 Mental Health & Substance Abuse Subcommittee
 Naming, Designating, & Private Acts Committee

During deliberation on a bill proposed by Dennis Powers to allow the use of firing squads as an execution method in March 2023, Sherrell suggested adding "an amendment on that that would include hanging by a tree also", which was denounced by Black lawmakers and other commentators as a racist reference to lynching. In response, representative Justin J. Pearson attempted to read out the names of lynching victims in Shelby County, where the majority of the lynchings in the history of Tennessee took place, but was cut off by House Speaker Cameron Sexton, who stated he was "out of line". Sherrell apologized for the remarks two days later. Members of the Tennessee Black Caucus criticized his apology for being "insincere" and campaigned for Sexton to reprimand Sherrell, with suggestions of removal from his committees and resignation.

Electoral record

References 

Living people
Republican Party members of the Tennessee House of Representatives
1959 births
21st-century American politicians